Emma-Lee is a Canadian pop singer, songwriter and photographer from Toronto, Ontario. She is considered a mezzo-soprano and is a self-taught vocalist. She has written hit songs for other artists in both the pop and country genres.

Early life
Emma-Lee was born in Toronto and raised in Markham, Ontario. She started playing guitar at age 14 and credits her father for teaching her. She soon began writing her own songs.

Published works

Albums

Never Just a Dream
She released her debut album Never Just a Dream in 2008 to critical acclaim from the Toronto Star and the Globe and Mail. The album was picked up by Bumstead Records and re-released on March 3, 2009. Her vocal style is frequently compared to k.d. lang, Norah Jones and Feist. No Depression magazine described Never Just a Dream as "an album so full of ideas and potential that it is hard to know how to properly frame a description of its contents. It is a collection of songs that is far more than the sum of its influences" and dubbed her "the voice to remember from 2009."

Emma-Lee's song "That Sinking Feeling" was featured as the single of the week on iTunes Canada.

In November 2016 she released her first Christmas recording "It Won't Be Christmas" (by songwriters Karen Kosowski & Julie Crochetière) to radio and iTunes.

Backseat Heroine 
On February 7, 2012, she released her long-awaited second album Backseat Heroine, co-produced by Emma-Lee, Karen Kosowski and Marc Rogers. The album features collaborations with Nicole Atkins, Jill Barber and Luke Doucet. Most of the album was tracked at The Chalet, a studio near Uxbridge, Ontario. Backseat Heroine blends multiple musical genres including pop, country, soul and rock. According to her online biography, "Emma-Lee's goal was to make a record that lived and breathed in its own world and could cross genres while still being a soundscape that was complete from start to finish."

Discography

Albums
 2009: Never Just a Dream (Bumstead Records)
 2012: Backseat Heroine (eOne Music Canada)
 2017: Fantasies: Volume 1 (Special Agent)

Singles

Awards and nominations

 2014, won for best female vocalist in NOW Magazine's best of Toronto feature.
 2013, her album Backseat Heroine won "Best Adult Contemporary Album"  and the video for "Shadow of a Ghost" was nominated for "Best Short Form Music Video" for the 12th annual Independent Music Awards.
 2013, her album Backseat Heroine won the 12th annual Independent Music Awards Vox Pop Fan Choice Award for "Best Adult Contemporary Album" and the video for "Shadow of a Ghost" won the Independent Music Awards Vox Pop Fan Choice Award for "Best Short Form Music Video."
 2013, won for best female vocalist in NOW Magazine's best of Toronto feature.
 2012, co-winner ROKKY Award for "Best Album" 
 2012, nominated for a CBC Radio 3 BUCKY award in the category of Hottest Pipes.
 2010, Emma-Lee's song "Until We Meet Again" from the album Never Just a Dream won in the 9th annual Independent Music Awards as "best love song".

Film/TV placements

 "Boomerang" in Syfy's Wynonna Earp
 "All The Way" in CBC's Hello Goodbye
 "Flow" in Degrassi: The Next Generation, CBC's The Border and Bomb Girls
 "Pick Me Up, Dust Me Off" in CBC's Heartland - performed by Carleton Stone
 "Never Just a Dream" in CBC's 18 to Life and Alias
 "That Sinking Feeling" in Tyler Perry's Why Did I Get Married Too?
 "Shot In The Dark" in HBO's Bloodletting and Miraculous Cures, Lifetime's Dance Moms, promotional ad for FX's Wilfred, 2014 feature film The Scarehouse
 "I Could Live With Dying Tonight" in NBC's Saving Hope and MTV's Teen Wolf
 "Shadow Of a Ghost" in Degrassi: The Next Generation
 "Figure It Out" in Beauty & the Beast
 "It Won't Be Christmas 'Til You're Here" in CBS' NCIS: Los Angeles - performed by Julie Crochetière

Collaborations

 sings backing vocals on the album "Let Me Prove It To You" by Steve Strongman (2014)
 sings backing vocals on the album "Rustbucket" by Sean Pinchin (2013)
 sings on "I Put a Spell On You" and "Ne Me Quitte Pas" on Jesse Cook's The Blue Guitar Sessions album (2012)
 sings a duet with country music artist Josh Macumber on his song "Tomorrow" (Josh Macumber Was Here, 2012)
 sings on "It Was You" by Peter Katz (Still Mind Still, 2012)
 sings on Jill Barber's song "Took Me By Surprise" (Mischievous Moon, 2011)
 sings on Rob Szabo's song "Something Like Me" (Rob Szabo, 2011)

Songwriting Credits (Selected Discography)

References

External links
 
 
 
 Fanbridge
 Emma-Lee on iTunes
 Emma-Lee on YouTube

Canadian singer-songwriters
Musicians from Toronto
Canadian women singers
Canadian folk rock musicians
Year of birth missing (living people)
Living people
Independent Music Awards winners